The following is a list of endangered species inhabiting Vietnam.

Annam chorus frog (Microhyla annamensis)

The Annam chorus frog is an endangered frog native to Vietnam, a frog in the family Microhylidae found in Cambodia, Laos, Thailand, and Vietnam.

Banded eagle ray (Aetomylaeus nichofii)

Banded eagle rays are widespread but vulnerable. Banded eagle rays live in the open ocean, coral reefs, and shallow seas.

Black-crested gibbon (Nomascus concolor)

All black, adult females vary from yellow and beige to orange-yellow and usually have dark hair on the chest or belly; infants are yellow with no tails and long arms. Pressure from hunters is blamed for the apes effectively losing their voices. Researchers have been unable to identify the Bac Kan group as they have stopped their signature early morning songs. Males and females sing complex harmonies to mate and to mark territory.

Delacour's langur (Trachypithecus delacouri)

A type of leaf-eating langur that has an unusually long and bushy tail with white hips. It is also one of the most endangered primates in the world. Only about 300 Delacour's langurs are alive today, and experts fear they could be completely extinct by 2014 if the current rate of decline continues. The monkeys are being pushed to the brink by hunting for the Chinese traditional medicine trade. Hunting has forced the animal into a few extreme strongholds, where steep limestone cliffs grant a little protection from poachers.

Great hammerhead (Sphyrna mokarran)

The great hammerhead shark is a shark from the family Sphyrnidae (hammerhead sharks). The great hammerhead shark lives in tropical and sub tropical waters worldwide. The "hammer" is used to attack whiptail rays. The great hammerhead can be found in many aquariums (such as the Georgia Aquarium). These animals need humans to keep going with conservation and stop hunting them for sharkfin soup.

Indochinese tiger (Panthera tigris corbetti)

The Indochinese tiger is also known as the Corbett's tiger. This species of tiger used to be thought as a Malayan tiger. The Indochinese tiger is the 2nd most common species of tiger. It is the species that lives in Vietnam.

Red-shanked douc (Pygathrix nemaeus)
The red-shanked douc is a species of Old World monkey native to Indochina which lives in the forests of Vietnam, Southern Laos and possibly Northeastern Cambodia. It is threatened by residential and commercial development.

Siamese crocodile (Crocodylus siamensis)

Siamese crocodiles are critically endangered. These animals prefer slow moving water such as swamps, rivers, and some lakes. Siamese crocodiles are threatened because of loss of habitat, illegal capture of wild crocodiles for supply to commercial farms, and incidental capture/drowning in fishing nets and traps.

Tam Dao salamander (Paramesotriton deloustali)

The Tam Dao salamander, or Vietnamese salamander, is an amphibian native to Vietnam. The salamander is threatened by loss of habitat.

Vietnam flying frog (Rhacophorus calcaneus)

Vampire flying frog (Rhacophorus calcaneus)

Vietnam gecko (Gekko vietnamensis)

Vietnamese leaf turtle (Geoemyda spengleri)

The Vietnamese leaf turtle is also known as the black-breasted leaf turtle or black-breasted hill turtle. This turtle is native to Vietnam and China. This animal is currently endangered.

Vietnam mouse-deer (Tragulus versicolor)

Vietnamese pheasant (Lophura hatinhensis)

The pheasant is listed endangered by the ICUN. Vietnamese pheasants only live in central Vietnam. They are threatened because of hunting and loss of habitat.

Vietnamese pond turtle (Mauremys annamensis)

Vietnam sucker frog (Odorrana chapaensis)

Yangtze giant softshell turtle (Rafetus swinhoei)

References

E
.
.
.
Vietnam
Vietnam